Chalk n Duster is a 2016 Indian drama film about commercialization of the Indian private education system, starring Shabana Azmi, Juhi Chawla, Zarina Wahab, Girish Karnad and Divya Dutta. The film talks about teachers' and students' communication, and highlights the problem of teachers and students in an educational system which is changing day by day. 

The film was directed by Jayant Gilatar, written by Ranjeev Verma and  Neetu Verma and produced by Amin Surani. 

Upon release, the film received mixed reviews from critics. The Hindustan Times said, "It’s a well told ethics versus greed story".

The film was made tax free in Delhi, Rajasthan, Uttar Pradesh and Bihar.

Plot

Vidya is one of the senior staff members at this fair to middling educational institution, which has thus far functioned smoothly under the able hands of Principal Indu Shastry (Zarina Wahab). Everything changes with the appointment of the new principal. The teachers face unpleasant surprises when the popular and considerate Indu is replaced by the ambitious and cut-throat Kamini, who aspires to upscale this middle-class school. Teachers' chairs are removed from the classrooms, the tea is no longer free and subjects are juggled so that, for example, the overweight Hindi teacher is now assigned physical training spoiling the whole dynamics of the school.

All of this is too much for the good-hearted Vidya, who suffers a heart attack after a sudden and unfair dismissal. In solidarity, her friend and colleague Jyoti  decides to take on Kamini and the misdirected board of trustees, led by Anmol (Arya Babbar). This entails using a TV channel as a platform for reminding viewers that teachers need support, recognition and more pay. 

The drama ends with a recovered Vidya and Jyoti taking on a Who Wants to Be A Millionaire-style quiz to win 5 crore rupees. The trade-off is that if they lose, they will have to accept their termination and leave their profession respectively. Vidya and Jyoti use their talents and win the quiz battle. Unwillingly, the trustee Anmol signs the bank cheque of 5 crore rupees. The principal Kamini apologizes to Vidya and Jyoti publicly on the TV show. At the end, Vidya reveals that she will be handing over the money to former principal Indu to build a school where no teacher will be discriminated against and students will have a good education for less cost.

Cast

 Shabana Azmi as Vidya Sawant
 Juhi Chawla as Jyoti Thakur
 Divya Dutta as Kamini Gupta, Principal of Kantaben High School
 Upasna Singh as Manjeet
 Girish Karnad as Manohar Sawant
 Zarina Wahab as Indu Shastry
 Sameer Soni as Sunil Thakur, Jyoti's Husband
 Jackie Shroff as Naresh Patel, Principal of DGM School
 Aarya Babbar as Anmol Parekh, Kantaben High School's Trustee
 Richa Chaddha as Bhairavi Thakkar, News Reporter
 Gavie Chahal IAS officer 
 Deepali Pansare as Naresh Patel's daughter
 Adi Irani
 Rishi Kapoor Host Of The Quiz Contest (Special Appearance)
 Karan Singh Chhabra 
 Kabir Arora
 Akshita Arora
 Naveen Sharma
 Salman Shaikh as Deepak Rajgaur
 Ranjeev verma
 Neetu verma
 Yug
 Jasbir Thandi

Soundtrack

Reception
According to Meena Iyer of Times of India Chalk N Duster has its heart in the right place. Made with an intention of showcasing the worms in the current education system, this film can be lauded to some degree - and gave it a 2.5/5 rating.

References

External links 
 

2016 films
2016 drama films
Indian drama films
2010s Hindi-language films
Films about educators
Films set in schools
Schools in fiction
Films about the education system in India
2010s high school films
Films scored by Sandesh Shandilya
Sony Pictures Networks India films
Hindi-language drama films
Columbia Pictures films
Sony Pictures films